Kwun Tong Maryknoll College (KTMC;) is a Catholic boys' secondary school in Hong Kong. It was founded in 1971. It was established by the Maryknoll Fathers, a society of Catholic priest and brothers which was founded in the United States in 1911. The college's anniversary day is the first Friday in May.

Kwun Tong Maryknoll College is one of the limited number of schools in Hong Kong which uses English as the medium of instruction. The school curriculum uses English as medium of instruction in all subjects with the exception of Chinese-related subjects.

History

Foundation

In the late 1950s, the Maryknoll Fathers had begun working in the Kwun Tong area. In 1962, the Maryknoll Father Society asked (Catholic Foreign Mission Society of America) the Education Department for assistance in building a subsidized Anglo-Chinese secondary school, Kwun Tong Maryknoll College, in Kwun Tong. The planning of the school was delayed by the unrest of the late 1960s and the serious inflation which upset all cost estimates. But eventually ground was broken in the summer of 1971 and the construction of the school building began. The school was founded finally in 1971.

Before completion of the school campus construction, students had to use the classrooms at Sing Yin Secondary School to have lessons. And unfortunately, the opening of the new school building was delayed three weeks due to the Sau Mau Ping landslide on 18 June 1972, but students were able to take possession of the new building on 25 September 1972.

School emblem 
The symbol, or emblem of Kwun Tong Maryknoll College was designed by its first Supervisor, Rev. John Cioppa, M.M., using the symbol of the Maryknoll Father Society – the 'Chi-Rho'. There are two Greek letters: Chi written as 'X' and Rho written as 'P'. These two letters are the first letters of the Greek word for Christ. The round figure, or oval, represents the globe or world for whom Christ came as Saviour.

Thus, the school's symbol shows its unity with the work of the Maryknoll Fathers in many countries throughout the world, the work of bringing Christ's love to all people and races.

The Maryknoll Fathers hope that each student will honour the school emblem by leading a good, upright life and by being an instrument of God's love in a world that needs truth and love.

School theme
The school theme of the year for 2011 to 2012 is "Modesty". (凡是要謙遜、溫和、忍耐，在愛德中彼此擔待。)

2010 to 2011 is "Let your "Yes" mean "Yes" and your "No" mean "No"." (你們的話該當是：是就說是，非就說非。)

2009 to 2010 : "Let us be concerned for one another, to help one another to show love and to do good."(我們應該彼此關懷，激發愛德，勉勵行善。)

2007 to 2008 : "Live up to the School Spirit, Support One Another in Learning." (仁信謙禮忠毅 學習互動互勵。)

2005 to 2006 :"Cherish Life, Nourish Life" (熱愛生命 豐盛人生)

Headmasters and supervisors 
A list of Kwun Tong Maryknoll College Supervisors since its founding in 1971.

A list of Kwun Tong Maryknoll College Principals since its founding in 1971.

Facilities
The college is  big and it is one of the biggest secondary schools in Kwun Tong District. It has 5 Laboratories (2 physics lab, 2 chemistry lab and 1 biology lab), 2 Covered Playgrounds, School Hall, Library, Lawn, Canteen, Geography Room, Art Room, Music Room, Language Room, Social Sciences Room, Cultural Subject Room, Computer Room, Computer Assisted Learning Room, Multimedia Learning Centre, Student Activities Centre, Pastoral Centre, Basketball Court, Volleyball Court and Gymnasium.

Admission 
Half of the college's total Form one students admitted are from primary schools in Kwun Tong District, with the remaining from other districts like Tseung Kwan O and Wong Tai Sin District. Every year, applicants are invited to attend an admission interview which is conducted in English. Other admission selection criteria include applicants' performance in extra-curricular activities, awards, certificates. Due to good reputation and the alumni's achievement, the competition among applicants during the admission selection procedure is very keen.

Houses

At the time of admission, each student is appointed to join one of the six houses randomly. Every year, the six houses compete with one another in the annual big competitions such as Sports Day, Swimming Gala and Music Contest, to see which house would be the annual overall champion. The Houses' names are as follows:

School song 
The school song was written by Mr. Lo Yui Chi; lyrics were by Rev. John Geitner. M.M.

College Publications

The college publishes a school yearbook and a school newspaper annually. The Student Publications Committee, part of the Student Council, is responsible for that.

Evergreen
 Evergreen, 長青, is the school newspaper of Kwun Tong Maryknoll College. Two issues are published for each academic year.

School Yearbook
The School Yearbook  for each academic year is published in September in the following school year.

Activities and achievements

Academic
Maryknollers are required to have two tests (1st – 8th test day) and two examinations (Mid Year and Final Examination) every year.

Students have consistently performed well in public examinations. In 2002, the first ever student achieving 10 distinctions (10 As), in the Hong Kong Certificate of Education Examination (HKCEE), Li Ki Kwong, was produced. Li was then admitted by the Faculty of Medicine at the University of Hong Kong through the Early Admission Scheme and graduated in 2007. In 2010, the last year of HKCEE, the college produced another student achieving 10 distinctions who is called Chu Chi Ho.

Extra-curricular
The college has eight Academic Groups, 11 Recreational Groups, 2 Religious Groups and 11 Service Groups such as the Community Youth Club, the Junior Police Call, and the Youth Red Cross. It provides students with many opportunities to participate in community services through the service clubs or groups. Social services undertaken include collecting second-hand clothes, flag-selling activities for charitable purposes and visiting nursing homes. And Activity section comprises many clubs which cater for various interest groups.

In sports, Kwun Tong Maryknoll College has conquered champions in bowling, basketball, cross country, football, trampoline, softball, and swimming competitions. Besides, KTMC students also participate in other competitions, such as art, business, computer programming, drama, International Physics Olympiad, mathematics, singing, and the Hong Kong Schools Music and Speech Festival.

Alumni (Maryknollers)

Cultural
Clifton Ko, MH, Hong Kong Film director, actor, producer and scriptwriter.
Keith Chan Siu-kei, Chinese lyricist and writer
, 阮紀宏, Deputy editor in chief in Ming Pao.
, 郭啟華, DJ, Chinese lyricist and writer
, 黃一山, Actor, Screenwriter
, 唐劍康, DJ, singer

Government
Patrick Nip, JP, Current Director of Social Welfare Department, former Deputy Secretary for Food and Health (Health)
Edmond Lau Ying Pan, JP. Executive Director, Monetary Management Department, Hong Kong Monetary Authority

Legal
Anthony Kwok, 郭啟安, District Judge of the District Court 
K.T. Kwok, 郭錦濤, Barrister-at-Law

Education and Academia
Arthur Yeung, 楊國安, Professor of China Europe International Business School, Professor of University of Michigan Business School
K.M. Luk, 陸貴文, Professor of CUHK

References

External links 

 Kwun Tong Maryknoll College Official Website
 College Alumni Association
 Kwun Tong Maryknoll College Library
 Kwun Tong Maryknoll College Campus Tour
 ktmc79.com

Boys' schools in Hong Kong
Educational institutions established in 1971
Maryknoll schools
Catholic secondary schools in Hong Kong
Secondary schools in Hong Kong
Kwun Tong